Toffee Apple is the fourth studio album by Australian musical artist, Peter Combe. It was released in June 1987 and peaked at number 86 on the Kent Music Report and was certified platinum in Australia in December 1989.

At the ARIA Music Awards of 1988, the album won the ARIA Award for Best Children's Album.

Track listing
 Side A
"Juicy Juicy Green Grass (A Sheep's Lament)"
"Moon Moon"
"The Silly Postman"
"Cats"
"Toffee Apple"
"Red Balloon"
"Standing on a Bus"
"Little Caterpillar"
"The Walking Song"
"Green Green Green"
"Baghdad"

 Side B
"Tadpole Blues"
"I Have"
"Dr. McKew"
"Jeffrey Hill"
"Jack and the Beanstalk"
"Why Don't We"
"Sweet Dreams and Teddy Bears"
"Take a Bath"
"That's The Way I Like It"
"Lullaby (for Tom)"

All songs composed, arranged and produced by Peter Combe.

Charts

Certifications

Release history

Personnel
Peter Combe - lead vocals, guitar
Additional musicians
Children From Sutherland Christian School, Sydney - backing vocals
Ross McGregor - piano, synthesizer
Doug Charleston - bass guitar
Graham Cox - guitar
John Grant - guitar
Michael Fix - guitar
Merv Dick - drums
Sean Gilroy - fiddle
Matt Tone - mandolin

References

1987 albums
Peter Combe albums
ARIA Award-winning albums